This is a list of members of the National Council of Provinces of the 27th South African Parliament.

Composition

Permanent delegates

Eastern Cape
 Thembinkosi Apleni (EFF)
 Zolani Mkiva (ANC)
 Zukiswa Ncitha (ANC)
 Nokuzola Ndongeni (ANC)
 Mlindi Nhanha (DA)
 Mandla Rayi (ANC)

Free State
 Armand Cloete (FF+)
 George Michalakis (DA)
 Seiso Mohai (ANC)
 Moletsane Moletsane (EFF)
 Moji Lydia Moshodi (ANC)
 Itumeleng Ntsube (ANC)

Gauteng
 Mbulelo Bara (DA)
 Mohammed Dangor (ANC)
 Amos Masondo (ANC)
 Kenny Motsamai (EFF)
 Winnie Ngwenya (ANC)
 Dennis Ryder (DA)

KwaZulu-Natal
 Lindiwe Bebee (ANC)
 Tim Brauteseth (DA)
 Yunus Carrim (ANC)
 S'lindile Luthuli (EFF)
 Simo Mfayela (IFP)
 Muzi Mthethwa (ANC)

Limpopo
 Mmamora Lilliet Mamaregane (ANC)
 Brenda Mathevula (EFF)
 Tebogo Portia Mamorobela (ANC)
 Mamagase Elleck Nchabeleng (ANC)
 Shahidabibi Shaikh (ANC)
 Beyers Smit (DA)

Mpumalanga
 Sonja Boshoff (DA)
 Dikeledi Gladys Mahlangu (ANC)
 Audrey Maleka (ANC)
 Archibold Nyambi (ANC)
 Sam Zandamela (EFF)

Northern Cape
 Willie Aucamp (DA)
 Martha Bartlett (ANC)
 Delmaine Christians (DA)
 Sylvia Lucas (ANC)
 Kenny Mmoiemang (ANC)
 Mmabatho Mokause (EFF)

North West
 China Dodovu (ANC)
 Fanie du Toit (FF+)
 Eric Landsman (ANC) 
 Betta Lehihi (EFF)
 Tebogo Modise (ANC)
 Carin Visser (DA)

Western Cape
 Mbulelo Magwala (EFF)
 Maurencia Gillion (ANC)
 Cathlene Labuschagne (DA)
 Jaco Londt (DA)
 Edward Njandu (ANC)
 Isaac Sileku (DA)

References